John Flannery may refer to:
John Flannery (American football) (born 1969), American football player
John Flannery (baseball) (born 1957), American baseball player
John Flannery (golfer) (born 1962), American golfer
John L. Flannery, CEO of General Electric